Heinz Giese (June 5, 1919 – October 19, 2010) was a German film and television actor. He was also a voice actor, dubbing foreign-language films for release in Germany.

Selected filmography
 All Clues Lead to Berlin (1952)
 The Captain and His Hero (1955)
 Love Without Illusions (1955)
 Thomas Müntzer (1956)
 The Black Chapel (1959)

References

Bibliography
 Sigfrid Hoefert. Gerhart Hauptmann und der Film: Mit unveröffentlichten Filmentwürfen des Dichters. Erich Schmidt Verlag, 1996.

External links

1919 births
2010 deaths
German male film actors
German male television actors
German male voice actors
Actors from Szczecin